Mong Khet Township  (also Mongkhat Township) is a township of Kengtong District in the Shan State of Burma. The principal town and administrative center is Mong Khet. It has been calculated to be the center of the Valeriepieris circle.

Communities
Among the many small towns and villages, in addition to the town of Mong Khet, the following communities are local centers: Wan Namtawnkang, Wan La, Wan Singpyin, Wan Hsi-hsaw, Wan Pang-yao, Wan Ho-hkü, Wan Kawnhawng, Wan Ho-nawng, and Ta-pom.

Mong Khet Circle

The Mong Khet Circle is a  diameter circle that contains more humans within it than outside of it, placed over east Asia, with its epicenter over Mong Khet.

References

External links
 "Mongkhak Google Satellite Map" Maplandia World Gazetteer

Townships of Shan State